The 7th Korfball World Championship was held in the Netherlands on 2003, with the participation of 16 national teams.

Preliminary round

Groups Round

Final round

Final ranking

See also
Korfball World Championship
International Korfball Federation

External links
International Korfball Federation

Korfball World Championship
Korfball World Championship
IKF World Korfball Championship
International sports competitions hosted by the Netherlands
Korfball in the Netherlands